The Necurs botnet is a distributor of many pieces of malware, most notably Locky.

Reports
Around June 1, 2016, the botnet went offline, perhaps due to a glitch in the command and control server running Necurs.  However, three weeks later, Jon French from AppRiver discovered a spike in spam emails, signifying either a temporary spike in the botnet's activity or return to its normal pre-June 1 state.

In a 2020 report, it was noted to have particularly targeted India, Southeast Asia, Turkey and Mexico.

Distributed malware
 Bart
 Dridex
 Locky
 RockLoader
 Globeimposter

See also
 Conficker
 Command and control (malware)
 Gameover ZeuS
 Operation Tovar
 Timeline of computer viruses and worms
 Tiny Banker Trojan
 Torpig
 Zeus (malware)
 Zombie (computer science)

References

Botnets
Cybercrime in India